Cyprus is a European Parliament constituency for elections in the European Union covering the member state of Cyprus. It is currently represented by six Members of the European Parliament.

Members of the European Parliament

Elections

2004

The 2004 European election was the sixth election to the European Parliament. However, as Cyprus had only joined the European Union earlier that month, it was the first election European election held in that state. The election took place on 13 June 2014.

The number of registered voters was 483,311 – out of which 503 were Turkish Cypriots and 2054 EU nationals – while the total number of people who voted was 350.387 or 72.50% of the registered voters. The number of polling stations was 1077, allocated to each polling district in the following manner: Nicosia 416, Limassol 323, Famagusta (free area) 50, Larnaca 169 and Paphos 119.

The six seats were contested by 59 candidates, belonging to parties or party coalitions or running as individuals. The conservative Democratic Rally and the left-wing Progressive Party of Working People (AKEL) achieved the largest shares of the vote.

2009

The 2009 European election was the seventh election to the European Parliament and the second for Cyprus.

2014

The 2014 European election was the eighth election to the European Parliament and the third for Cyprus.

2019

The 2019 European election was the ninth election to the European Parliament and the fourth for Cyprus.

References

External links
 European Election News by European Election Law Association (Eurela)
 List of MEPs europarl.europa.eu

European Parliament elections in Cyprus
European Parliament constituencies
2004 establishments in Cyprus
Constituencies established in 2004